The 900 Series, nicknamed and commonly known as "Meneghino" is an electric multiple unit manufactured by Italian companies Firema  and AnsaldoBreda, designed for the Milan Metro. 

Its nickname means of Milan in Italian. 

Each Traction Unit consists of two identical motor cars and a trailer with the driver's cab. All the coaches are intercommunicating. The traction voltage can be 750 V or 1500 V to comply with the different voltages and feeding systems in use on Milan Metro lines (fourth rail on M1, catenary on M2 and M3).
Trains have a total of 24 doors per side and are equipped with surveillance cameras and LCD screens.

The train began to replace the old Milan Metro trains on March 2009 on lines 1, 2 and 3. It is not used on the line 5, which is a small-sized driverless system.

References

AnsaldoBreda multiple units
Milan Metro
750 V DC multiple units
1500 V DC multiple units
Electric railcars and multiple units of Italy